Miles Benjamin Anthony Robinson is the self-titled debut album by Brooklyn, New York's Miles Benjamin Anthony Robinson.  It was originally recorded, produced and arranged in 2006 with Chris Taylor of Grizzly Bear, was released on July 1, 2008.  The album features contributions by Grizzly Bear's Daniel Rossen and Christopher Bear and TV on the Radio's Kyp Malone.

Track listing 

 "Buriedfed" - 4:50
 "The Debtor" - 4:14
 "Woodfriend" - 3:17
 "Who's Laughing?" - 5:07
 "The Ongoing Debate of Present vs. Future - 4:22
 "My Good Luck" - 4:37
 "Written Over" - 2:43
 "Mountaineered" - 5:27
 "Above the Sun" - 3:14
 "Boneindian" - 4:59

References 

Miles Benjamin Anthony Robinson albums
2008 albums
Albums produced by Chris Taylor (Grizzly Bear musician)